KCON is an annual convention held in locations across the world, created by Koreaboo and organized by CJ E&M. It was first held in Southern California in 2012 and has since expanded to ten countries as of 2022.

In 2015, KCON expanded to Japan and then quickly announced the first KCON USA on the East Coast. In 2016, KCON expanded into Abu Dhabi, United Arab Emirates and Paris, France. In January 2017, KCON announced that they would be hosting their first KCON Mexico at the Mexico City Arena on March 17 and 18, 2017.

An online replacement of KCON due to the ongoing COVID-19 pandemic, titled KCON:TACT, started on June 20 until June 26, 2020 via YouTube, AISPlay, and Shopee. The second season started on October 16, 2020 and ended on October 25, 2020. The third season started March 20, 2021.

Background
KCON was first created by Koreaboo in 2012, after a partnership with CJ E&M's US-based subsidiary, Mnet America. It was produced by Powerhouse Live, who have continued to work on KCON from 2013 to the present. KCON's initial aim was to establish an annual flagship event that would improve the experiences of American fans by providing them with an affordable way to connect with each other as well as with artists and professionals from the K-pop music industry. During KCON '12, Mnet Media's Ted Kim was interviewed by journalist Michael Holmes from CNN to discuss the rise of K-Pop in the United States.

On June 21, 2016, Euny Hong reported in the Wall Street Journal that the North American KCONs, although very popular, were only a break-even financially. CJ E&M's American CEO Angela Killoren said they are more interested in the long-term goal of raising Korea's brand value than short-term gain.  Also, in a June press conference, Shin Hyung-kwan, president of CJ E&M's Mnet contents business, said, "KCON, which has been held in Abu Dhabi in March, Japan in April, and Paris early this month, is not just about making money. Numbers are important but what matters more is the potential created by the event for the next five, 10 and 20 years."  Shin added that the company goals were increasing the growth of products and services to the global market by expanding partnerships with Korean small and medium enterprises.

History

2012
KCON '12 was held on October 13 at the Verizon Wireless Amphitheatre in Irvine, California. Music artists invited to perform include 4Minute, B.A.P, Exo-M, Nu'est, VIXX, and G.NA. Jeff Yang of The Wall Street Journal reported that KCON '12 attracted over 20,000 people.

2013

KCON '13 was held from August 24 to 25 at the Los Angeles Memorial Sports Arena. The lineup included K-pop artists Exo (K & M), 2AM, Teen Top, f(x), G-Dragon, Crayon Pop, Dynamic Duo, Yu Seung Woo and DJ Koo. It also included rapper Missy Elliott, who is featured on one of G-Dragon's singles. Super Junior-M's Henry Lau performed and spoke at a panel.

2014

KCON '14 was held on August 9–10, returning for a second year to Los Angeles Memorial Sports Arena. The artist lineup included B1A4, BTS, CNBLUE, G-Dragon, Girls' Generation, IU, Jung Joon-young, Spica, Teen Top, and VIXX.  Featured guests included Lee Seung-gi, Lee Seo-jin, Yoo In-na, Nam Gyu-ri, Kim Ji-seok; and Eric Nam, who hosted red carpet interviews, filmed by Viki.DramaFever documented the red carpet, explaining the missing Girls' Generation 9th member, Sooyoung, who was filming a drama.NBC News interviewed Billboard K-Town columnist Jeff Benjamin, journalist-author Euny Hong, and Girls' Generation's Seohyun and Tiffany to answer "what is K-pop"." In response to Fusion TV, KCON co-project manager Angela Killoren said, "There's still this sense that, I'm the fan, and I'm the only fan, or I'm one of very few, and these are my artists, you have this incredible sense of – you discovered them, and you own them."

The two nightly concerts were shown on the weekly K-pop cable television show M Countdown. "2 Nights in LA" was broadcast on Mnet America in the U.S. and in multiple countries.
Danny Im of Mnet America's show "Danny From LA" hosted the concerts, along with "DFLA" co-host Dumbfoundead,  Jung Joon-young, Tiffany, and opener Lee Seung-gi."DFLA", in its third season, filmed a live taping of the show at the convention.

For this year's event, Mnet America started a new web-series, "KCON EXPERIENCE 2014", with multiple episodes, including footage of the stars' arrival at the airport in Los Angeles, backstage activities, and the weekend's panels, fan meetings, food stands. The convention included an outdoor marketplace, food truck alley, a mini 4DX theatre, and open stage area; with panels and workshops about music, k-dramas, e-sports, choreography styles, makeup, hair trends; and as billed, "all things Hallyu". Korean gaming channel OnGameNet (OGN) also organized a "League of Legends Champion Festival", an event involving Korean team CJ Entus Frost and American team Cloud 9.

The convention doubled attendance from the previous year, with 42,000 attending. Of those 42,000, nearly 40 percent come from outside California, most were female, and less than 10 percent were Korean.

2015

Saitama, Japan – April 22
KCON '15 expanded outside the United States for the first time and was held in Japan at the Saitama Super Arena. M.I.B's Korean-Japanese vocalist KangNam was the events ambassador. The convention/outdoor stage featured Korean artists CODE-V, High4, Shu-I, Tahiti, and 5tion. Performances on the main stage included Got7, Super Junior, Kangnam, My Name, Lovelyz, Block B, Sistar, Infinite, B1A4, 2PM's Jun. K, and Supernova.

Freelance journalist Patrick St. Michel, who has lived in Japan for years, covered the Saitama event for MTV Iggy, complimenting the eagerness of the enthusiastic fans (15,000 at the concert), and KCON 15's successful soft sell of K-pop as a means to help smooth over a long and complicated relationship between Japan and South Korea.

Los Angeles – July 31 – August 2
On April 17, 2015, KCON said the California convention would expand to a three-day event, and would move from the Los Angeles Memorial Sports Arena to L.A. Live and the Staples Center in Downtown Los Angeles.

The convention was preceded with U.S. news reports about the drama and film stars to attend, People interviewed "Korean heartthrob" Kim Soo-hyun, and The Hollywood Reporter accounted for Kim (My Love from the Star), Korean American Ki Hong Lee (The Maze Runner, one of People's "Sexiest Men Alive"), U.S. born Daniel Henney (his latest Criminal Minds: Beyond Borders) and Son Ho-jun (Reply 1994); as well as drama sessions to be headlined by writer Park Ji-eun (producer, My Love From Another Star) and director Jin Hyuk (Master's Sun, Doctor Stranger). Actor Son Ho-jun and director Go Min-gum of tvN's "Mr. Baek the Homemade Food Master" appeared at DramaFever's co-sponsored screening room of trending K-dramas.

English-language South Korean media Yonhap called the musical line-up "some of the hottest K-pop artists." It included AOA, Block B, Crush, Got7, Monsta X, Red Velvet, Roy Kim, Shinhwa, Sistar, Super Junior and Zion.T. Getty Images captured photos of Kim Soo-hyun, Eric Nam, and many of the musical performers, individually identifying each name in girl groups AOA, Red Velvet and Sistar.
 
Billboard noted new group Monsta X after their performance, as a "hot item on the KCON lineup", referring to a similar audience response to KCON '14's newest group, BTS, a group that continued to do a sold-out tour in the U.S. a year later. Billboard gave detailed positive reviews for both night's concerts, and interviewed Red Velvet and Got7.

The Los Angeles Times reviewed Sunday's stage, "the year's most significant concert for one of the world's most fascinating music and cultural scenes." "Mega-group" Super Junior's fan base, the "ELFs", were noticed by media, wearing their blue devil horns, with one 23-year-old describing that when she was sad, just looking at Super Junior made her really happy. Fusion TV named seven of their "favorite KCON fashion statements" of the performing bands.

Another South Korean English-language newspaper, The Korea Times, headlined, "K-pop proves itself a gateway to South Korea at KCON", and interviewed two "older" fans, aged 28 and 31, whose developing interest in K-pop and K-dramas led them to further interests in other Korean culture (technology, skin products, food and fashion). As in previous years, the convention attempted to satisfy attendees, with one South Korea language based institute helping fans write messages of love and support to their favorite stars in Korean. KCON organizer Killoren reiterated that the convention was not just music, but more, "a convention, a concert, content, a conversation."

South Korea government's web portal Korea.net article stated 120 small and medium-sized enterprises set up booths, and included photos taken by Small and Medium Business Administration staff.  They said, "Angelenos have shown their strong enthusiasm for all things Korean."

New York – August 8
In 2015, KCON expanded to New York City, being held outside of Southern California for the first time.

A day before opening, Vogue discussed fashion and favorite designers with AOA and VIXX, the later kept busy with a first time "showcase" in Orlando, Florida. Vogue told East Coast K-pop fans to "rejoice...KCon, America's premier (read: only) Korean pop culture convention comes to New York for the first time this weekend, bringing four of the country's top acts stateside", and "Keep your eyes and ears out for snappy songs and slick dance moves, but above all, for the colorful fashion trends." After focusing on the idol's fashion wear in L.A., Fusion TV shared the East Coast's fan's homemade and designer fashions.

Killoren told Fusion TV that fans are eager to learn as much as possible about their idols, so the convention tries to provide this, through Q&A sessions with artists by emcees, and "hi-touches" or high fives between fans and band members.

The Korean Cultural Service New York (KCSNY) combined their fifth annual global K-pop singing and dancing competition (with auditions held worldwide) with KCON, for a pre-show concert of six finalists. N.Y.'s Washington Heights group, The Class, won with a performance of VIXX's "Hyde", and will travel to South Korea to represent the U.S. at the K-Pop World Festival.

Teen Top's appearance made them the first band to perform for three consecutive years; along with Girls' Generation, AOA and VIXX.

Billboard's review compared the concert and convention to the inaugural KCON '12 in Irvine, California, pointing to this year's fewer musical acts, but a similar convention set-up, and gave indication of it becoming an "East Coast staple."
 
The New York Times said, "The tears began as soon as Teen Top waved hello", and interviewed passionate fans, some who lined up for the concert at 2:00 a.m., and attended both the West and East Coast shows. They described fans who wear facial cleanser used by actress Song Ji-hyo of variety show Running Man and according to DramaFever watch over 53.9 hours per month streaming videos, compared with about 10.7 hours for Netflix users, are 85 percent non-Asian, and are mostly women aged 18 to 24.

Fuse TV said the convention attendees were represented by all racial demographics, "women didn't outnumber men the way you'd normally see at a pop music convention",  and "teens were out in full force, but not the majority."

Jeju, South Korea – November 6–7
In November, KCON held its first 2-day domestic convention and concerts on the South Korean island of Jeju. Daily solo performances were held at the convention hall stage, and a main stadium concert on the second night, with a line-up including Shinhwa, Roy Kim, Block B, SG Wannabe, SPICA, M.I.B's Kangnam, Poten, Park Boram (soloist from Superstar K2), Oh My Girl, Shin Seung-hun, Teen Top, Day6, Paloalto, Mamamoo, Sonamoo and Chen Zi Tong.

The Jeju Tourism Organization and CJ E&M said the event was scheduled in hopes of revitalizing the local economy by drawing more tourists to the island.

2015 total attendance
By the end of August, KCON '15's total attendance for the U.S. and Japan was 90,000; L.A.'s three days had 58,000 attendance and the two concerts in Staples Center with a sold-out crowd of 28,000 fans and Gross Sales $2,055,800, Newark's total was 17,000, and Saitama had 15,000.

In November, the yearly attendance totals grew to 107,000, with the addition of the Jeju dates, which approximately 17,000 attended.

2020–2021 KCON:TACT 
In 2020, all in-person KCON events scheduled were all cancelled due to the COVID-19 pandemic. On May 14, 2020, KCON announced that it will be taking place on Mnet's YouTube channel on June 20–26, 2020 titled, "KCON:TACT", with 4 hours of concert every day, a Meet and Greet, and other benefits included with a YouTube Membership. The second season of KCON:TACT was held from October 16 until October 25 on Mnet and KCON's YouTube channel through membership.

On February 16, 2021, Mnet announced that the online concert and meet and greet is coming back for 9 days, from March 20–28, 2021

2022 
In 2022 KCON is the year KCON switched from online to in person again. Due to the pandemic, the previous years (2020-2021), was held online. In 2022 it will be held in South Korea, Japan, the United States, and Saudi Arabia. It will be held from May 7 to October 16.

Reception
Jeff Benjamin, Billboard K-Town columnist, wrote that the convention has "hit every note to provide a new look at a world of music still gaining ground in the U.S.", and with thousands of people from all over North America attending KCON ‘12, the convention has "truly proved its ability to pass language barriers and kick-start what may be an annual music tradition." The Orange County Register described KCON ‘12 as "A daylong K-Pop invasion at Verizon Wireless Amphitheater".

In 2014, New York City's Fuse TV said, "In just three years, KCON has become an annual pilgrimage for K-pop fans in America." NBC News said, "Thousands of screaming fans and the stars they adore gathered in Los Angeles for KCON, a celebration of Korean pop music and culture". Miami's Fusion TV called KCON '14 "the mother ship of all Korean culture events in this country", and observed, "k-pop fans might be the most devoted in the entire world." Melissa Block of NPR's All Things Considered said of KCON '14, "K-pop is here to stay."

In 2015, Daniel Kreps of Rolling Stone wrote: "KCON has become so popular in the U.S. that even the Los Angeles fest is expanding to a larger venue...as attendance has ballooned since the inaugural KCON LA in 2012", and "will go bi-coastal...and head to Newark", adding, "KCON also hosted their first ever Japan convention." August Brown of the Los Angeles Times wrote: "In its early years, many wondered whether a South Korean act (other than Psy) could impact mainstream top-40 pop. But after watching the Sunday night installment of KCON 2015, it's clear that's the wrong question. K-pop's young and wide-ranging audience is the new mainstream in America."

Locations and dates

See also
 HallyuPopFest
 Dream Concert

References

External links

 

Music festivals staged internationally
Conventions in California
CJ E&M
K-pop concerts
K-pop festivals
Music festivals established in 2012